This article lists the comprehensive discography for English death-doom metal band My Dying Bride.

Studio albums

Compilation albums

Demos

EPs

Live albums

Singles

Video albums

Music videos

References 

Discographies of British artists
Heavy metal group discographies